Adam James Densten (born 31 July 1990) is an Australian television personality and podcaster known for appearing alongside his friend Symon Lovett in the Australian reality television program Gogglebox.

Television and podcasts
Densten started appearing as a main cast member on Gogglebox when it first started. However after the tenth season, he and Lovett decided to leave the show but returned to the show for its fourteenth season. They have remained on the show since then.

In January 2021, Densten and Lovett appeared as contestants on the seventh season of I’m A Celebrity…Get Me Out Of Here! Australia they were the last celebrities to enter the jungle and Densten was the seventh contestant to be eliminated.

Later that year, Densten and Lovett launched a podcast on LISTNR called The Adam And Symon Show.

Appearances 
 Gogglebox Australia (2015-2019, 2021-)
 I’m A Celebrity…Get Me Out Of Here! Australia (2021)

References

Living people
1990 births